Lamina cribrosa may refer to:
Cribriform plate of the ethmoid bone (horizontal lamina or lamina cribrosa ossis ethmoidalis)
Lamina cribrosa sclerae, a mesh-like structures which allows nerve fibres of the optic nerve to pass through the sclera

See also 
 Lamina (anatomy)